Taras is a surname. Notable people with the surname include:

Connor Taras (born 19??), Canadian kayaker 
Jamie Taras (born 1966), Canadian football player
John Taras (1919–2004), American ballet master and choreographer 
Martin Taras (1914–1994), American cartoonist
Raymond Taras (born 1946), Canadian political scientist